Mama Koite Doumbia  is a Malian and a member of the Economic, Social and Cultural Council of the African Union, representing West Africa.

Mama Koite Doumbia holds a higher diploma in youth training.
She was elected chairperson of the African Women's Development and Communication Network (FEMNET) in 2003.
In this role she was a member of the Permanent Committee of the Economic, Social and Cultural Council of the African Union.
In February 2011 she received the 2011 FAMEDEV Gender Award.

References

External links
Membership of the President of the UN General Assembly’s Task Force for the High-Level Plenary Meeting of the Sixty-Fifth Session of the General Assembly 24 March 2010, UN Non-Governmental Liaison Service, Retrieved 27 October 2010

Economic, Social and Cultural Council Standing Committee members
1950 births
Living people
21st-century Malian women politicians
21st-century Malian politicians
21st-century Malian people